Le Fils de Gascogne (Gascogne's Son) is a French film directed by Pascal Aubier from a scenario by Patrick Modiano and Pascal Aubier, released on 8 May 1996.

The adventures of Harvey, guide of a group of Georgian singers in Paris, and Dinara their interpreter, are used as a framework to provide a fantastic and nostalgic evocation of the cinema of the 1960s.

Synopsis
Harvey, a timid provincial young man, accommodate a troop of Georgian choristers accompanied by Dinara, their interpreter (a quarter Russian: "my father is Tatar, my mother is half Russian, half Jewish"), and acts as their guide in Paris.

In a restaurant,a customer joins the singers and claims to recognize Harvey as the son of a script writer named Gascogne, who died twenty-five years earlier in an automobile accident. Marco, one of his friends, tries to profit from this situation, made all the easier as Harvey was born from an unknown father. He tries to find the reels of a film which Gascogne made just before his death in order to sell them to a collector.

During this search, he introduces a group of 1960s stars to the two young people, despite the initial scepticism of Harvey and the growing mistrust of Dinara.

Cast
 Grégoire Colin (Harvey)
 Dinara Droukarova (Dinara)
 Jean-Claude Dreyfus (Marco)
 László Szabó (the restaurant client)
 Pascal Bonitzer (Hiblen, the authorised representative)
As themselves
 Yves Afonso
 Anémone
 Stéphane Audran
 Jean Benguigui
 Jean-Claude Brialy
 Claude Chabrol
 Michel Deville
 Stéphane Freiss
 Otar Iosseliani
 Bernadette Lafont
 Valérie Lalonde
 Richard Leacock
 Patrice Leconte
 Macha Méril
 Bulle Ogier
 Marie-France Pisier
 Jean Rouch
 Alexandra Stewart
 Marina Vlady
 etc.

References

External links

French musical comedy-drama films
1996 films
1990s French films